Niall Mitchell(born 1997) is an Irish hurler who plays as a centre-forward for the Westmeath senior team.

Born in Clonkill, County Westmeath, Mitchell first played competitive hurling at juvenile and underage levels with the Clonkill club. He subsequently played with the club's senior team, winning a county championship medal in 2015.

Mitchell made his debut on the inter-county scene at the age of sixteen when he was selected for the Westmeath minor team. He had two championship seasons with the minor team, before later joining the under-21 team. Mitchell made his debut with the Westmeath senior team during the 2016 championship.

Career statistics

Honours

Clonkill
Westmeath Senior Hurling Championship (1): 2015, 2018
Westmeath Junior Hurling Championship (1): 2014

Westmeath 
Bord Gáis U21 Team of the Year 2016

References

1997 births
Living people
Clonkill hurlers
Westmeath inter-county hurlers